Maurice Kemp (born February 2, 1991) is an American basketball player who plays the power forward position for Bnei Herzliya in the Israeli Basketball Premier League. He previously played for the Maccabi Rishon LeZion in the same league, and in several other leagues from 2013–21; namely, the EuroCup, NBA G League, Greek Basket League, Liga Nacional de Básquet, Liga ACB, and the VTB United League.

He played college basketball for Alabama A&M, Miami Dade College, and East Carolina, with whom he led Conference USA in scoring in his senior year.

Early life

He was born in Miami, Florida, to Valerie and Maurice Kemp, Sr., and he has three siblings. Kemp grew up in Miami, as well as Pembroke Pines, Florida.

Kemp attended Miami Dade Christian Academy, graduating in 2009, and played for the basketball team. As a senior, he averaged 26 points and 11 rebounds a game. He was named second-team All State and first-team All County as a senior. He was also on the high school track and field team.

College

2009–2011: Alabama A&M and Miami Dade College 
Kemp attended Alabama A&M from 2009–10, playing for the Alabama A&M Bulldogs basketball team. He averaged 5.5 points per game, on 47.8% shooting from the field, and 34.8% shooting from beyond the 3 point line; he also picked up 2.8 rebounds per game.

He then attended Miami Dade College from 2010–11. Playing small forward for the Sharks basketball team, Kemp averaged 16.9 points on shooting percentages of 59% from the floor, 52% behind the 3-point line, and 65% on free throws, while also averaging 9.9 rebounds (17th nationally), 1.8 assists, 1.8 blocks, and 1.5 steals a game. He was named as first-team All-Florida Community College Activities Association.

2011–2013: East Carolina 
Kemp then attended East Carolina University (ECU), where he majored in child development and family relations, and played basketball for the East Carolina Pirates as a junior in 2011–12. Here, he averaged 10.5 points and 6.3 rebounds per game. He also shot 77.9% on free throws across the entire season (7th in Conference USA), and 88.9% on free throws during conference games (which led the conference); his 2.4 offensive rebounds per game were 10th in the conference. He was unanimously selected as a member of the Conference USA Men's Basketball All-Academic Team.

As a senior at ECU in 2012–13, Kemp led Conference USA (C-USA) in scoring with 18.9 points per game (becoming the first player in the program's history to lead the C-USA in scoring), and in points (660). He was 2nd in the conference in field goals (231; 15th in the NCAA), 2-point field goals (215; 9th in the NCAA), and free throws made (182), 4th in field goal percentage (50.5%), 4th in defensive rebounds (193), and 5th in steals (61) and steals per game (1.1). He became the third player with the Pirates to score more than 600 points in a single season, and established new school single-season records for made and attempted free throws (182/241, respectively), and minutes played (1,202). He received first-team All-Conference USA (the first East Carolina player to receive them), and second-team National Association of Basketball Coaches (NABC) All-District 11 honors, as well as being named MVP of the 2013 CollegeInsider.com Tournament (CIT).

He ended his career with the Pirates ranked ninth in school history with 66 blocks.

Professional career
In his professional career, Kemp played in 2013–14 for Alba Fehérvár in the EuroCup, where he averaged 12.3 points and 1.5 steals per game, and shot 82.1% from the free throw line. He then played during the 2014–15 season for the Canton Charge of the G League, and in 2015–16 for Kavala B.C. in the Greek Basket League. In 2016–17, he played for the Tadamon Zouk of the Lebanese Basketball League, where he averaged 23.4 points (3rd in the league), with 8.6 rebounds (8th), and 1.9 steals (5th). He then moved on to the Liga Nacional de Básquet, where he played for the Obras Sanitarias in 2017–18; here, he averaged 20.7 points per game, leading the league. 

He then played in 2018–19 for Montakit Fuenlabrada in the Liga ACB, and in 2020–21 for Kalev/Cramo in the VTB United League, where he averaged 12.5 points and 5.5 rebounds per game, and was 9th in the league with 0.9 blocks per game, with a .548 field goal percentage (2nd). He also helped the team win the Latvian-Estonian Basketball League and was named the MVP of the competition.

He then brought his game to Israel. In 2021-22, Kemp played for Maccabi Rishon LeZion in the Israeli Basketball Premier League, where he averaged 16.0 points (10th in the league), 6.4 rebounds, and 2.0 assists per game. He joined Bnei Herzliya in the Israeli Basketball Premier League on December 8, 2021.

See also
East Carolina Pirates men's basketball statistical leaders

References

External links 
East Carolina Pirates bio
College stats @ sports-reference.com

1991 births
Living people
Alabama A&M Bulldogs basketball players
American expatriate basketball people in Estonia
American expatriate basketball people in Greece
American expatriate basketball people in Hungary
American expatriate basketball people in Israel
American expatriate basketball people in Spain
American men's basketball players
Baloncesto Fuenlabrada players
Basketball players from Miami
BC Kalev/Cramo players
Bnei Hertzeliya basketball players
Canton Charge players
East Carolina Pirates men's basketball players
Greek Basket League players
Israeli Basketball Premier League players
Maccabi Rishon LeZion basketball players
Miami Dade Sharks men's basketball players
Power forwards (basketball)
Sportspeople from Pembroke Pines, Florida